PRANA is the first Russia's predictive analytics and remote monitoring IIoT system. It was developed by ROTEC JSC under the supervision of  M.V. Lifshitz, Chairman of the Board of Directors of the company.

The system's name "PRANA" originated from the combination of words "PRedictive ANAlytics". The system predicts probable incidents due to early detection of defects, i.e. 2–3 months before they affect the equipment operability.

It has been registered with the Unified Register of Russian Software and the US Copyright Office.

History 

In 2012, ROTEC JSC established a service department for power gas turbines. One of the areas of the long-term service was remote monitoring and control of the equipment technical condition which was subsequently singled out as an individual service. $5.5 million were invested into the system development. In 2013, the first prototype for a gas turbine was created.

In 2015, a pilot project was launched at Perm CHP-9 where the first incident was prevented. Still in 2015, the Situational Center was established in order to form digital archives of data coming from facilities there. They were analyzed by ROTEC specialists who then provide the operating personnel with appropriate recommendations.

That same year, the system was patented, the development team was headed by Mikhail Valerievich Lifshitz, Chairman of the Board of Directors of ROTEC. Besides, the system was registered with the US Copyright Office. By 2021, 31 patents describing the methods and systems of PRANA's operation have been introduced.

In 2017, the Ministry of Telecom and Mass Communications included PRANA in the Unified Register of Russian Software. Such companies as Mosenergo and T Plus started to apply the predictive analytics system.

That same year, ROTEC signed an agreement with Tatenergo to connect Kazan CHP-1 to PRANA. The system started to operate at the facility in 2019.

In 2018, a new version of the system featuring elements of artificial intelligence and machine learning was released. The set of initial data to be analyzed by the system has been expanded due to applying the acoustic emission method which made it possible to monitor the condition of not only rotating equipment, but also static objects, e.g. foundations, pipes, tanks, and other pieces of equipment of the oil and gas industry. Monitoring and analysis of the condition of high-capacity power transformers have been introduced.

That same year, AlfaStrahovanie applied PRANA for the first time to retrospectively analyze incidents which caused the occurrence of insured events.

As of 2019, PRANA was the only Russia's predictive analytics system that has been in commercial operation for over 5 years. The system has been installed at 22 CCGT and GTU power units with a total capacity of more than 3.2 GW (that is 2 % of the Russian thermal power industry).

In 2019, it was started to supply the system abroad. The system was introduced by Pavlodarenergo JSC, a company in Kazakhstan. In 2020, at least three incidents were prevented due to the company's system operation.

As of 2020, the system has succeeded in preventing more than 300 incidents. In 2020, according to ROTEC, one of the Russian generating companies reduced the number of accidents by more than 16.8 times and cut its losses by more than 13.6 times owing to PRANA. Another generating company secured a decrease in its losses over several years: in 2017, it incurred losses in the amount of $10.1 million (without the predictive analytics system); in 2019, these costs were reduced to $1.8 million due to applying the PRANA system. In 2021, PRANA switched over to Yandex ClickHouse Database Management System.

As of 2021, the system monitored more than 130 pieces of sophisticated industrial equipment with a total cost of about $5 billion.

Mechanism of operation

General principle of operation 
The system continuously carries out diagnostics, makes an assessment of the service life of units and components, analyzes and predicts changes in the technical condition of the facility. It may be represented by any industrial unit or its component parts. The system can be applied to the equipment produced by Siemens, GE, Alstom, Ansaldo, LMZ, UTW, JSC United Engine Corporation, REP Holding.

PRANA has a two-level structure. The lower level receives data coming from the facility's APCS or other data recorders. Thereafter, the data are securely transmitted to the upper level to the remote DC (data center) of the Situational Center where they are being accumulated and mathematically processed. Upon detection of any changes in the technical condition, the system gives an appropriate warning thereof in the event log. These data are stored throughout the entire life cycle of the facility. The system is capable to analyze 30 thousand parameters per second. while the archive containing the data processed by PRANA exceeds 50 TB.

The system's mathematical tool is grounded on similarity-based modeling methods. The system generates a reference digital pattern, i.e. a set of the facility's mathematical models which describes the error-free behavior of equipment in various modes of operation. To build it, the ideology of the Hotelling T2 Control Charts is used. The model value is calculated by means of the state matrix and using the similarity operator for each measured value. The residual and standard deviation are calculated using the difference between the reference and actually measured values for each parameter. Residuals are normalized and the integral criterion of technical condition T2 is calculated on an aggregate basis. Owing to analyzing the T2 criterion, changes in the technical condition of equipment are predicted and all possible dependences of parameters are monitored.

PRANA identifies and ranks the contribution of each technological parameter along with predicting the parameters' going beyond their technological limits. As soon as the system has accumulated and analyzed the statistics, it becomes possible to generate rules for the automatic detection of faulty units and components.

System functions 
PRANA features the following functions:
 Building of reference mathematical models for various modes of the equipment operation with due consideration to its individual characteristics.
 Automatic indication and notification (sms, email) of any changes in the monitored parameters as compared with the reference ones.
 Automated analytics of the causes of changes.
 Predicting the likely period of the equipment failure-free operation.
 Comparative analysis of various modes of the equipment operation for facilities belonging to the same type.
 Identification of hazardous modes of the equipment operation.
 Predicting the service life of units.
 Backup storage for repository data.
 Secure remote access to data on the equipment operation on a real time basis.=

References 

Analytics